Carlos Francisco Theodoro Machado Ribeiro de Lessa, better known simply as Carlos Lessa (30 July 1936 – 5 June 2020) was a Brazilian economist and professor.

Life and career
Born on 30 July 1936, in Rio de Janeiro, to a wealthy family, Lessa studied at private schools in his native city.

In 1959, he graduated in economics at the Federal University of Rio de Janeiro and later got a Master's degree at Conselho Nacional de Economia. In 1980 he finished his doctor's degree in Human sciences at University of Campinas.

Lessa worked as a professor at Federal University of Rio de Janeiro and at the Rio Branco Institute, the Brazilian diplomatic graduate school.

In 2002, Lessa was elected Rector of the Federal University of Rio de Janeiro. It was his post for a brief period of time between July 2002 and March 2003.

In 2003, Lessa was appointed President of the Brazilian Development Bank by Brazilian President Luiz Inácio Lula da Silva. His tenure lasted from January 2003 to November 2004 and his resignation was a result of multiple disagreements over economic policies with Central Bank of Brazil President Henrique Meirelles and Minister of Development, Industry and Foreign Trade Luiz Fernando Furlan

Personal life and death
Lessa was a huge fan of Brazilian Carnival and founded Minerva Assanhada, a Carnival block composed mostly of Federal University of Rio de Janeiro students and personnel. Lessa's son, Rodrigo Lessa is a singer-songwriter and Multi-instrumentalist.

Lessa died from complications of COVID-19 in Rio de Janeiro on 5 June 2020, during the COVID-19 pandemic in Brazil at the age of 83.

References

1936 births
2020 deaths
Federal University of Rio de Janeiro alumni
20th-century Brazilian economists
21st-century Brazilian  economists
People from Rio de Janeiro (city)
Deaths from the COVID-19 pandemic in Rio de Janeiro (state)
Rectors of universities in Brazil